Roxane Permar (born 1952, in Philadelphia, USA) is an artist who has worked in the field of public art and socially engaged practice for over 20 years. Her career has been based in the UK, where she lived and worked in London before moving to Scotland in 1998.  Her practice is situated locally, nationally and internationally.

Early Career in London
In the mid-1980s she was a member of the Brixton Artists Collective  in London where she was an active participant in Women's Work.   Her on-going series, The Nuclear Family (1984–1990), was influenced by the political and cultural context of London at this time.

Russia
In the 1980s she translated a book on Russian and Soviet Theatre.  In 1985 she was a cultural delegate to the World Youth Festival in Moscow where she exhibited her Nuclear Family. In more recent years she has exhibited in St. Petersburg at the Manezh Central Exhibition Hall. She co-initiated the emplacements project (1997–2003) with Francoise Dupré, working with artists from the UK, Western Europe and Russia to stage events in London and St. Petersburg, culminating in temporary public art events throughout St. Petersburg in 2003. the emplacements project at New Holland in 2000 opened the grounds to the general public for the first time in the city's history.   For the International Festival of Experimental Art in St. Petersburg in 2008 she invited people from various parts of the world, including Shetland, to participate in an exchange of films made on mobile phones, Swap Shots. Edited versions have been exhibited in Russia, Denmark and Shetland. Permar presented a paper about the project at isea2009 in Belfast.

Shetland Projects
In 1990 Permar worked with Susan Timmins to create the public art project, The Nuclear Roadshow, and from 1992 to 1995 she worked with Wilma Johnson on The Croft Cosy Project.   Permar has worked with young people in Shetland through projects largely focussing on the use of digital media and the Internet, including Fishtastic: The Scalloway Moving Image Project  The Sonic Postcards Project for the Sonic Arts Network and Shetlands' Cauld Waaters (2001–02) commissioned by Scottish Natural Heritage.  She is a founder member of Veer North, Shetland's Visual Artists group. She created Come and Go (2007, Soundtrack, David Sjoberg), a film for the permanent displays in the new Shetland Museum and Archives.

New Technologies and Underwater Exploration
In the late 1990s Permar began to work with sound producing  site specific sound installations, such as 'In-take' for a former wine vat in France.  In 2000 Permar undertook a Scotland Year of the Artist Residency at Subsea7 in Aberdeen when she began to investigate the relationship between technology and underwater exploration. The residency culminated in a body of work exhibited at The Aberdeen Maritime Museum (2001) and the Shetland Museum (2002).   The film, Through the Moonpool, was exhibited in Crossover UK in 2003 and again in Japan in 2005.  For Crossover UK 2004 she exhibited The Webnitki, a collection of animations made for the Internet at a Lab Culture residency. The webnitki, are characters who 'knit' their way across the world's continents, 'threading' their way across time and space, land, sea and 'through the moonpool'. The work reflects urban and rural environments, drawing on subject matter related to Permar's experience of living and working in diverse cultures. She invented the word 'webnitki' by combining the English word 'web' with the Russian word 'nitki', meaning 'threads'.

Participatory and Temporary Public Art Projects
Participation and collaboration in temporary public art projects have been an ongoing concern in Permar's practice.   Commissions include Echolalia's Walsall Archive for In Memoriam (The New Art Gallery  Walsall, 2000–01),  Park Matters (London, 2004)  and Blueprints, (Newlyn Art Gallery 2005–07).  In 2007 she and Susan Timmins created  Domestic Dialogues, a collaborative project linking Shetland and St Petersburg, Russia through dialogue, gift-giving and exchange. In 2006 her project, Roseland, combined installation, gift-giving and exchange through exhibitions and events in Shetland, Roydon (near London) and Düsseldorf.  Mirrie Dancers is a public art project conceived in collaboration with Nayan Kulkarni using the medium of light and commissioned by Shetland Arts Development Agency for Mareel, Shetland's new music, cinema and education venue.  In 2010 she participated in the first International Arts Festival in Baku where local residents helped paint her contribution to the event.

Teaching and Community Education
Throughout her career Permar has worked in art education and displayed a commitment to integrating processes for learning and teaching into her artwork. She has been a lecturer and visiting tutor at colleges throughout the UK, including  Saint Martin's School of Art  in London, Birmingham City University (formerly University of Central England) and Gray’s School of Art, Aberdeen, Scotland, as well as working in schools, community and art gallery education. She has visited art colleges in Russia and the USA.  Currently she teaches on the BA Contemporary Textiles course at Shetland College University of the Highlands and Islands.

References 

1952 births
Living people
American artists